African environmental issues are caused by human impacts on the natural environment and affect humans and nearly all forms of life. Issues include deforestation, soil degradation, air pollution, water pollution, garbage pollution, climate change and water scarcity (resulting in problems with access to safe water supply and sanitation). These issues result in environmental conflict and are connected to broader social struggles for democracy and sovereignty.

Deforestation

The large scale felling of trees and the resulting decreases in forest areas are the main environmental issues of the African Continent. Rampant clearing of forests and land conversion goes on for agriculture, settlement and fuel needs. Ninety percent of Africa's population requires wood to use as fuel for heating and cooking. As a result, forested areas are decreasing daily, as for example, in the region of equatorial evergreen forests. According to the United Nations Environment Programme, Africa's desertification rate is twice that of the world's.

The rate of illegal logging, which is another main cause of deforestation, varies from country to country, such as 50% in Cameroon and 80% in Liberia. In the Democratic Republic of the Congo, deforestation is primarily caused by the needs of the poor citizens, along with unsupervised logging and mining.
In Ethiopia, the main cause is the country's growing population, which induces an increase in agriculture, livestock production, and fuel wood. Low education and little government intervention also contributes to deforestation. Madagascar's forest loss is partially caused by citizens using slash-and-burn techniques after independence from the French. In 2005, Nigeria had the highest rate of deforestation in the world, according to the Food and Agriculture Organisation of the United Nations (FAO). Deforestation in Nigeria is caused by logging, subsistence agriculture, and the collection of wood for fuel. According to the gfy, deforestation has wiped out nearly 90% of Africa's forest. West Africa only has 22.8% of its moist forests left, and 81% of Nigeria's old-growth forests disappeared within 15 years. Deforestation also lowers the chance of rainfall; Ethiopia has experienced famine and droughts because of this. 98% of Ethiopia's forests have disappeared over the last 50 years.
Within 43 years, Kenya's forest coverage decreased from about 10% to 1.7%. Deforestation in Madagascar has also led to desertification, soil loss, and water source degradation, resulting in the country's inability to provide necessary resources for its growing population. In the last five years, Nigeria lost nearly half of its primary forests.

Ethiopia's government, along with organizations like Farm Africa, is starting to take steps to stop excessive deforestation.

Deforestation is an issue, and forests are important in Africa, as populations have relied heavily on them to provide basic needs. Woods are used for shelter, clothing, agricultural elements, and much more. Woodland supplies are also used to create medicines and a wide variety of food. Some of these foods include fruits, nuts, honey, and much more. Wood is crucial for economic gain in Africa, especially in developing countries. Forests also help the environment. It is estimated that the green belt of Africa contains over 1.5 million species. Without the forest habitat to protect the species, the populations are at risk. The livelihoods of millions of people and species are at risk with deforestation. The act is a domino effect that affects multiple aspects of a community, ecosystem, and economy.

Many African nations have begun to implement restoration projects to reverse the effects of deforestation. These projects have been shown to improve the environment in many ways and the livelihood of the people living near them. For example "Reforestation and agroforestry schemes can help, for instance, to sequester carbon, prevent flooding, enhance biodiversity, rehabilitate degraded lands, provide a local energy supply for the rural poor and improve land use and watershed management."

Soil degradation

The erosion caused by rains, rivers and winds as well as over-use of soils for agriculture and low use of manures have resulted in turning the soils infertile, as for example, in the plains of the Nile and the Orange River. A main cause of soil degradation is lack of manufactured fertilizers being used, since African soil lacks organic sources of nutrients.  The increase in population has also contributed when people need to crop, as a source of income, but do not take measures to protect the soil, due to low income. The current methods create too much pressure on other environmental aspects, such as forests, and are not sustainable. There are also ecological causes of the poor soil quality. Much of the soil has rocks or clay from volcanic activity. Other causes include erosion, desertification, and deforestation. Another source of soil degradation is the improper management of waste, lack of facilities and techniques to handle waste lead to the dumping of waste in soil, therefore causes soil degradation by process such as leaching.

Degradation of African soil causes decreased food production, damaging ecological effects, and an overall decrease in the quality of living in Africa. This issue would lessen if fertilizers and other cropping supplies were more affordable and thus used more. The United Nations has commissioned a Global Assessment of Human Induced Soil Degradation (GLASOD) to further investigate the causes and state of the soil.  Access to information collected is freely available, and it is hoped that awareness will be raised among politicians in threatened areas.

Air pollution

The air in Africa is greatly polluted due to multiple reasons stated below. The primitive method of farming that takes place in most areas in Africa is certainly a causal factor. The United Nations' Food and Agriculture Organization (FAO) estimates that 11.3 million hectares of land are being lost annually to agriculture, grazing, uncontrolled burning and fuelwood consumption. Combustion of wood and charcoal are used for cooking and this results to a release of carbon dioxide into the atmosphere, which is a toxic pollutant in the atmosphere. Also, due to the poor supply of power, most homes have to rely on fuel and diesel in generators to keep their electricity running. Air pollution in Africa is coming to the forefront and must not be ignored. For example, in South Africa the mercury levels are severe due to coal combustion and gold mining. Mercury is absorbed from the air into the soil and water. The soil allows the crops to absorb the mercury, which humans ingest. Animals eat the grass which has absorbed the mercury and again humans may ingest these animals. Fish absorb the mercury from the water, humans also ingest the fish and drink the water that have absorbed the mercury. This increases the mercury levels in humans. This can cause serious health risks.

It is expected that Africa could represent the half of the world's pollution emissions by 2030, warns Cathy Liousse director of research of atmospheric sounding of the CNRS, along with many other researchers. According to the report, sub-Saharan Africa is experiencing a fast increasing pollution, derived from many causes, such as burning wood for cooking, open burning of waste, traffic, agri-food and chemical industries, the dust from the Sahara carried by the winds through the Sahel area, all this reinforced by a greater population growth and urbanisation.

The World Health Organization reports of the need to intervene when more than one third of the total Disability Adjusted Life Years was lost as a result of exposure to indoor air pollution in Africa. Fuel is needed to power lights at night. The fuel being burned causes great emissions of carbon dioxide into the atmosphere. Because of the increased Urbanization in Africa, people are burning more and more fuel and using more vehicles for transportation. The rise in vehicle emissions and the trend towards greater industrialization means the urban air quality in the continent is worsening. This is also the case in many megacities in Nigeria where the key contributors to poor air quality include vehicle emissions, industrial emissions and solid waste burning. Seasonal variations in pollution also exist with the highest levels of air pollution occurring during the dry season (November to March in the north, May to September in the south).

In many countries, the use of leaded gasoline is still widespread, and vehicle emission controls are nonexistent. Indoor air pollution is widespread, mostly from the burning of coal in the kitchen for cooking. Compounds released from fuel stations and nitrogen and hydrocarbon released from airports cause air pollution.  Carbon dioxide other greenhouse gases in the air causes an increase of people with respiratory issues.

There is a common relationship between air pollution and population. Africa widely diverse between areas that are overpopulated versus areas that are scarcely populated. In regions where there is little industrial development and few people, air quality is high. Vice versa, in densely populated and industrialized regions the air quality is low. Addressing the air pollution in big cities is often a big priority, even though the continent as a whole produces little air pollutants by international standards. Even so, air pollutants are causing a variety of health and environmental problems. These pollutants are a threat to the population of Africa and the environment they try so hard to sustain.

In 2019, air pollution killed 1.1 million people across Africa, according to a study published in The Lancet Planetary Health in October 2021. More than 350 million African children live in households that use solid fuels, mostly wood and coal, for cooking and heating. The emissions from these solid fuels are the main causes of indoor air pollution.

Climate change

Water scarcity

Plastic pollution 

Like in other parts of the developing world, plastic pollution is causing widespread problems such as contamination of waterways, disruption of stormwater management, and increases of disease due to mosquitos and pests living in plastics. Plastic mismanagement is both a combination of cheap supply by all kinds of manufacturers, for example by providing much needed access to water through bottled water and water sachets, and poor management of the waste after use. 

Some locations in Africa have also been the sourcing of dumping plastic waste from the Global North. Some governments are responding, and the continent leads the rest of the world in plastic bans which reduced allowed use and manufacture of single use plastics such as plastic bags and food serving tools.

See also
African Environment (bulletin)
Africover (UN project)
AFR100
Environmental issues in the Niger Delta
Movement for the Survival of the Ogoni People

Further reading 

 Globalization and Environmental Conflict in Africa
 Environmental Conflict in Africa
 Environmental impacts and causes of conflict in the Horn of Africa: A review

References

Hillstrom, Kevin, and Laurie Collier Hillstrom. The Worlds environments. a continental overview of environmental issues. Santa Barbara, CA, ABC-CLIO, 2003.

External links
 Fleshman, Michael  "Saving Africa’s forests, the ‘lungs of the world’" January 2008 United Nations

Africa